William Walter Budness (January 30, 1943 – January 24, 2018) was a professional American football player who played linebacker for seven seasons for the Oakland Raiders.

He played in three consecutive AFL title games (1967, 1968, and 1969),
with his team winning in 1967, earning the right to play in Super Bowl II.

He is considered one of the best linebackers to play for Boston University where he graduated in 1964 with a degree in Education.

After retiring from professional football, he put his degree to work, teaching gym at Greenfield High School, in Greenfield, Massachusetts.

William W. Budness, son of the late William and Charlotte (Ludwin) Budness died peacefully on January 24, 2018, surrounded by his loved ones at Paradise Senior Living in Georgetown, DE.

References

1943 births
2018 deaths
American football linebackers
Oakland Raiders players
Boston University Terriers football players
People from Chicopee, Massachusetts
American Football League players